Baku Choreography Academy, BCA for short, formally Baku Choreography School, is a high school in Baku, Azerbaijan, specialized in general, secondary and higher education programs in the field of choreography.

Baku Choreography Academy was established on April 30, 2014 by the decree of the President of the Republic of Azerbaijan Ilham Aliyev. It was established on the basis of Baku Choreography School.

The Baku Choreography Academy was established to ensure the development of highly qualified personnel in choreography. It was established to provide the need of developing the choreographic art traditions in the Azerbaijan.

On August 1, 2014, the President of the Republic of Azerbaijan signed a decree to provide design works related to the construction of the Baku Choreographic Academy building. According to the decree, 2 million Azerbaijani manats were allocated to the Ministry of Culture and Tourism of the Republic of Azerbaijan from the Reserve Fund of the President of the Republic of Azerbaijan.

References 

Universities in Baku
Educational institutions established in 2014
2014 establishments in Azerbaijan